Persoonia prostrata is a plant in the family Proteaceae and is endemic to the northern tip of K'gari in Queensland, but is presumed to be extinct. It is similar to Persoonia stradbrokensis but is a prostrate shrub with smaller leaves and flowers.

Description
The species is only known from two collections and may be of a prostrate form of P. stradbrokensis, although that species has not been found on K'gari.

Taxonomy
Persoonia prostrata was first formally described in 1810 by Robert Brown in Transactions of the Linnean Society of London from specimens he collected near the coast of Sandy Cape in 1802.

Distribution and habitat
This geebung is only known from the Brown's type collection and another collected near the end of the 19th century, both from Sandy Cape on K'gari, where it grew on sand dunes in heath, woodland or forest.

Conservation status
Persoonia prostrata is classified as "extinct" under the Australian Government Environment Protection and Biodiversity Conservation Act 1999 and the Queensland Government Nature Conservation Act 1992.

References

prostrata
Extinct flora of Australia
Flora of Queensland
Fraser Island
Proteales of Australia
Plants described in 1810
Taxa named by Robert Brown (botanist, born 1773)